Argyrogramma signata, the green semilooper, is a moth of the family Noctuidae.

Distribution
It is found in Africa, it is found on the Canary Islands, Egypt, Ghana, Ivory Coast, Madagascar, Mauritius, São Tomé, the Seychelles, Sierra Leone, South Africa, Tanzania, Uganda and Zambia. In Asia, it is found in Bangladesh, Myanmar, India (Andhra Pradesh, Bihar, Karnataka, Maharashtra, Sikkim, Tamil Nadu and Uttar Pradesh), Indonesia, (Java, Kalimantan, Sulawesi and Sumatra), Malaysia (Malaya and Sarawak), Pakistan, the Philippines, Sri Lanka, Taiwan, Thailand and Vietnam. Furthermore, it is found in Australia (Queensland), the Cook Islands, Fiji, New Caledonia, Papua New Guinea, the Solomon Islands, Tonga and Vanuatu.

Description
The wingspan is about 25–32 mm. Palpi with short third joint. Hind femur of male not tufted with long hair. Head, thorax and forewings are pale reddish brown. Abdomen pale with dorsal tufts small. Forewings with a copper tinge. The sub-basal, antemedial and postmedial line are more prominent and less waved. There are some black specks beyond the sub-basal line. The tail of the "Y-mark" detached from the arms. The patch and black specks on outer margin absent. Hindwings nearly uniform pale of dark fuscous.

The larvae feed on Cruciferae species, legumes, tobacco, Eleusine coracana, Eucalyptus, eggplant, sunflower and Amaranthus species.

References

External links
Pheromones and Semiochemicals of Argyrogramma signata

Plusiinae
Owlet moths of Africa
Moths of Asia
Moths of Oceania
Moths described in 1794